Daniel Alejandro Morales Reyes, known by his stage name Danny Ocean, is a Venezuelan singer, songwriter and record producer born in Caracas, Venezuela. He began his professional music career in 2009 with the creation of his YouTube channel.

He is best known for his song "Me Rehúso", released in September 2016, and relaunched as an English version titled "Baby I Won't" in 2017.

Discography

Studio albums

EPs 
2009: 
Backstage (as Danny O.C.T.)

2014:
Paracaídas (as Danny O.C.T)
Sin Intención (as Danny O.C.T.)

2015:
U-YE (as Danny O.C.T.)
Pronto (as Danny O.C.T.)

Singles

Collaborations 
 2016:
 "Replay" (featuring DJ Katastraphy, Bri Nichole, Rello Muse & Philup Banks)
 2018:
 "Epa Wei" (produced by Skrillex)
 2019:
 "Looking For" (by Digital Farm Animals)
 "Voodoo" with David Guetta, Stargate, Tiwa Savage & Wizkid (by Coldplay as Los Unidades)
 "Raptame" by Reik (as composer and producer)
 "Mamacita" by Jason Derulo and Farruko (as producer and writer beside Digital Farm Animals & Lil 'Eddie)
 "Dime Tú" (with Maye and Fernando Osorio)
 "Detente" (featuring Mike Bahía)
 "Lazy Day" (by Fuse ODG Ft. Ed Sheeran)
2020
 "Cuando Amanezca" by Nibal (with J Quiles & Feid)
 "Midsummer Madness 20" (Midsummer Madness Remix) by 88rising (with Joji, Rich Brian, August 8, Higher Brothers & Niki)
 “Miedito O Qué” (with Karol G & Ovy On The Drums)
 “Ay, DiOs Mío!” By Karol G (As composer) 
2021
 "Tú No Me Conoces" (with TINI)
 “Milímetros” by Lagos (as composer) 
 “Mónaco” (with Lagos) 
 “Cámbiate el Nombre” By Lagos (as composer) 
 “Cuantas Veces” (with Justin Quiles) 
 “Machu Picchu” by Camilo Echeverry and Evaluna Montaner  (as composer)
 “DVD” by Karol G (as composer)
 “No Eres Tú Soy Yo” (with Maria Becerra )
 “Picó” (with Yera, Blackie & Lois)

Other singles
 "Eres Tú La Musa" (Ft. ZsW ZeroSWar) as Danny O.C.T.
 "Ese Lugar" (Ft. Oma) as Danny O.C.T.
 "Demasiado Tarde" (Ft. KC Clan) as Danny O.C.T.
 "Un Cigarro"
 "Sunday Morning Driving"
 "120 Kilómetros"
 "Mueve Tu Cuerpo"
 "OXES"
 "Besarnos de Cero"

Awards and nominations

References 

1992 births
Living people
Latin pop singers
Urbano musicians
Male composers
21st-century Venezuelan male singers
Venezuelan composers
Singers from Caracas
Latin music songwriters